Bulimulidae is a taxonomic family of medium-sized to large, air-breathing, tropical and sub-tropical land snails, terrestrial pulmonate gastropod molluscs in the superfamily Orthalicoidea.

Distribution
Distribution of species in the family Bulimulidae includes Ecuador (9 genera) and other South American countries. Some species also occur in North America.

Fossil record
The family's oldest fossil record dates from the late Cretaceous of Brazil (Itaboraí Basin).

Anatomy
Members of this family have a haploid chromosome number between 26 and 30 (according to the values in this table).

Shells of species within Bostrycinae have a smooth protoconch and the genital organs feature a relatively long penis sheath (ca. 1/4–1/6 total phallus length).

Taxonomy 
Previously, the members of the Orthalicidae were also included in this family, as the subfamily Orthalicinae, and the taxa listed here were placed in their own subfamily, the Bulimulinae.

2005 taxonomy 
Bulimulinae was placed in the family Orthalicidae according to the taxonomy of the Gastropoda (Bouchet & Rocroi, 2005).

The subfamily Bulimulinae included 3 tribes:
 Tribe Bulimulini Tryon, 1867 - synonyms: Bulimidae Guilding, 1828 (inv.); Berendtiinae P. Fischer & Crosse, 1872; Bothiembryontidae Iredale, 1937
 Tribe Odontostomini Pilsbry & Vanatta, 1898 - synonym: Tomogeridae Jousseaume, 1877
 Tribe Simpulopsini Schileyko, 1999

2010 taxonomy 
Breure et al. (2010) moved Bothriembryon to Placostylidae (since 2012 as Bothriembryontidae), elevated Bulimulinae to Bulimulidae and Odontostomini to Odontostomidae.

2012 taxonomy 
Breure & Romero (2012) confirmed previous results from 2010, additionally they elevated Simpulopsini to Simpulopsidae. There are three subfamilies within Bulimulidae:

 subfamily Bulimulinae Tryon, 1867
 subfamily Peltellinae Gray, 1855
 subfamily Bostrycinae Breure, 2012

Genera 
Genera in the family Bulimulidae include:
subfamily Bulimulinae Tryon, 1887 (synonym: Berendtiinae P. Fischer & Crosse, 1872)
 Anctus E. von Martens, 1860
 Auris Spix, 1827
 Berendtia Crosse & P. Fischer, 1869
 Bocourtia Rochebrune, 1882
 Bulimulus Leach, 1814 - type genus of the subfamily Bulimulinae
 Cochlorina Jan, 1830
 Graptostracus Pilsbry, 1939
 Kora Simone, 2012
 Lopesianus Weyrauch, 1958
 Naesiotus Albers, 1850
 Neopetraeus E. von Martens, 1885
 Newboldius Pilsbry, 1932
 Otostomus H. Beck, 1837
 Oxychona Mörch, 1852
 Protoglyptus Pilsbry, 1897
 Pseudoxychona Pilsbry, 1930
 Rabdotus Albers, 1850
 Scutalus Albers, 1850
 Spartocentrum Dall, 1895
 Sphaeroconcha Breure, 1978
 Stenostylus Pilsbry, 1898
 Suniellus Breure, 1978
subfamily Peltellinae
 Drymaeus Albers, 1850
 Peltella Gray, 1855 - type genus of the subfamily Peltellinae

subfamily Bostrycinae
 Bostryx Troschel, 1847 sensu lato- type genus of the subfamily Bostrycinae

Unassigned within Bulimulidae
 Bulimus Bruguière, 1789 (temporary name)
 Itaborahia Maury, 1935
 † Oreoconus D. W. Taylor in McKenna et al., 1962 
 † Palaeobulimulus Parodiz, 1949 
 Stapafurdius Simone, 2021
 † Tocobaga Auffenberg, Slapcinsky & Portell, 2015

Synonyms
 Adzharia P. Hesse, 1933: synonym of Bulimulus Leach, 1814 (junior synonym)
 Antidrymaeus Germain, 1907: synonym of Drymaeus (Mesembrinus) Albers, 1850 represented as Drymaeus Albers, 1850
 Atahualpa Strebel, 1910: synonym of Thaumastus E. von Martens, 1860
 Ataxellus Dall, 1912: synonym of Bostryx (Geopyrgus) Pilsbry, 1896 represented asBostryx Troschel, 1847
 Ataxus Albers, 1850: synonym of Bostryx Troschel, 1847
 Bilamelliferus Weyrauch, 1958: synonym of Bostryx Troschel, 1847 (junior synonymy)
 Cochlogena Férussac, 1821: synonym of Bulimulus Leach, 1814 (junior synonym)
 Diaphanomormus Weyrauch, 1964: synonym of Drymaeus (Mesembrinus) <small>Albers, 1850 </small r>represented as Drymaeus Albers, 1850
 Elatibostryx Weyrauch, 1958: synonym of Bostryx Troschel, 1847
 Floreziellus Weyrauch, 1967: synonym of Bostryx Troschel, 1847 (junior synonymy)
 Geoceras Pilsbry, 1896: synonym of Bostryx (Geopyrgus) Pilsbry, 1896 represented as Bostryx Troschel, 1847
 Globulinus Crosse & P. Fischer, 1875: synonym of Rabdotus Albers, 1850
 Goniognathmus Crosse & P. Fischer, 1875: synonym of Drymaeus Albers, 1850 (junior synonym)
 Hamadryas Albers, 1850: synonym of Drymaeus Albers, 1850
 Hannarabdotus Emerson & Jacobson, 1964: synonym of Rabdotus Albers, 1850
 Kionoptyx Haas, 1966: synonym of Bostryx Troschel, 1847 (junior synonymy)
 Kuschelenia Hylton Scott, 1951: synonym of Bocourtia (Kuschelenia) Hylton Scott, 1951 represented as Bocourtia Rochebrune, 1882
 Leptodrymaeus Pilsbry, 1946: synonym of Drymaeus (Mesembrinus) Albers, 1850 represented as Drymaeus Albers, 1850
 Leptomerus Albers, 1850: synonym of Bulimulus Leach, 1814
 Leptomormus Weyrauch, 1958: synonym of Drymaeus  (Mesembrinus) Albers, 1850 represented as Drymaeus Albers, 1850
 Liostracus [sic]: synonym of Leiostracus Albers, 1850 (misspelling of original genus, Leiostracus Albers, 1850)
 Loboa Ihering, 1917: synonym of Bulimulus Leach, 1814
 Mormus E. von Martens, 1860: synonym of Drymaeus Albers, 1850
 Multifasciatus Weyrauch, 1958: synonym of Bostryx (Geopyrgus) Pilsbry, 1896 represented as Bostryx Troschel, 1847
 Naesiotellus Weyrauch, 1967: synonym of Bostryx Troschel, 1847 (junior synonym)
 Navicula Spix, 1827: synonym of Cochlorina Jan, 1830
 Nesiotes E. von Martens, 1860: synonym of Naesiotus Albers, 1850
 Obstrussus Parodiz, 1946: synonym of Naesiotus Albers, 1850
 Olinodia Dall, 1920: synonym of Naesiotus (Reclasta) Dall, 1920 represented as Naesiotus Albers, 1850
 Orphaicus Schaufuss, 1869: synonym of Thaumastus E. von Martens, 1860
 Orphnus Albers, 1850: synonym of Thaumastus E. von Martens, 1860
 Orthotomium Crosse & P. Fischer, 1875: synonym of Rabdotus Albers, 1850
 Pachyotus H. Beck, 1837: synonym of Auris Spix, 1827
 Pachytholus Strebel, 1909: synonym of Thaumastus E. von Martens, 1860
 Pampasinus Weyrauch, 1958: synonym of Bostryx (Platybostryx) Pilsbry, 1896: synonym ofBostryx Troschel, 1847
 Peronaeus Albers, 1850: synonym of Bostryx Troschel, 1847
 Phenacotaxus Dall, 1912: synonym of Bostryx (Geopyrgus) Pilsbry, 1896 represented as Bostryx Troschel, 1847
 Plecochilus Agassiz, 1846: synonym of Plekocheilus Guilding, 1827 (unjustified emendation)
 Pseudoperonaeus Weyrauch, 1958: synonym of Bostryx (Geopyrgus) Pilsbry, 1896 represented as Bostryx Troschel, 1847
 Pseudorhodea Dall, 1895: synonym of Rabdotus (Plicolumna) J.G. Cooper, 1895 represented as Rabdotus Albers, 1850
 Pyrgus Albers, 1850: synonym of Bostryx (Geopyrgus) Pilsbry, 1896 represented as Bostryx Troschel, 1847
 Rhabdotus [sic]: synonym of Rabdotus Albers, 1850 (incorrect subsequent spelling)
 Rhaphiellus L. Pfeiffer, 1856: synonym of Naesiotus Albers, 1850
 Rimatula Parodiz, 1946: synonym of Protoglyptus Pilsbry, 1897
 Saeronia Dall, 1920: synonym of Naesiotus Albers, 1850
 Semiclausaria L. Pfeiffer, 1856: synonym of Drymaeus Albers, 1850 (junior synonym)
 Siphalomphix Rafinesque, 1833: synonym of Bulimulus Leach, 1814
 Sonorina Pilsbry, 1896: synonym of Rabdotus (Leptobyrsus) Crosse & P. Fischer, 1875 represented as Rabdotus Albers, 1850
 Spiroscutalus Pilsbry, 1932: synonym of Scutalus Albers, 1850
 Stenostoma Spix, 1827: synonym of Anctus E. von Martens, 1860
 Tatutor Jousseaume, 1887: synonym of Thaumastus E. von Martens, 1860
 Teneritia J. Mabille, 1898: synonym of Spartocentrum Dall, 1895
 Tholus Strebel, 1909: synonym of Thaumastus E. von Martens, 1860
 Xenothauma Fulton 1896: synonym of Scutalus Albers, 1850
 Zaplagius Pilsbry, 1896: synonym of Cochlorina Jan, 1830

References
This article incorporates CC-BY-3.0 text from the reference

 Bouchet P., Rocroi J.P., Hausdorf B., Kaim A., Kano Y., Nützel A., Parkhaev P., Schrödl M. & Strong E.E. (2017). Revised classification, nomenclator and typification of gastropod and monoplacophoran families. Malacologia. 61(1-2): 1-526

Further reading

External links 

 
Taxa named by George Washington Tryon
Gastropod families